The Arcado String Trio was first an American, later international Jazz trio active from 1989 to 1993. The ensemble was formed by the cellist Hank Roberts, the bassist Mark Dresser and the violinist Mark Feldman. Roberts was later replaced by Ernst Reijseger.

The Arcado String Trio drew inspiration from Billy Bang's String Trio of New York and the Kronos Quartet. Their chamber music showed influences of Django Reinhardt and Jimi Hendrix.

Selected discography 
 1989 - Arcado String Trio (JMT Records)
 1991 - Behind the Myth (JMT)
 1992 - For Three Strings and Orchestra (JMT/WDR), with the WDR Rundfunkorchester Köln conducted by David de Villiers
 1995 - Double Trio Green Dolphin Suite (Enja)
 2020 - Deep Resonance, with Ivo Perelman (Fundacja Słuchaj)

Bibliography 
 Richard Cook & Brian Morton: The Penguin Guide to Jazz on CD. Penguin, 6th Edition, London, 2002.

References

External links 
 Arcado String Trio on AllMusic
 Arcado String Trio on Discogs
 Arcado String Trio - Gartman's (YouTube)

American jazz ensembles
American musical trios
American experimental musical groups
Musical groups established in 1989
1989 establishments in the United States
Musical groups disestablished in 1993
1993 disestablishments in the United States